The discography of Australian alternative rock band Atlas Genius consists of two studio albums, two remix albums, three extended plays, seven singles, and six music videos.

Albums

Studio albums

Extended plays

Remix albums

Singles

Notes
A  "Trojans" did not enter the Billboard Hot 100, but peaked at number 8 on the Bubbling Under Hot 100 Singles chart.

Music videos

Cover songs

References

Alternative rock discographies
Discographies of Australian artists